George Batten may refer to:

 George Batten (advertiser) (1854–1918), opened the George Batten Newspaper Advertising Agency in New York City, 1891
 George Batten (baseball) (1891–1972), infielder in Major League Baseball
 George W. Batten (1856–1922), American businessman and politician, New York State Treasurer